Balliamo e cantiamo con Licia (Let's Dance and Sing with Licia) is an Italian television series. It is the fourth live adaptations of the Japanese manga Ai Shite Knight. It is the sequel to Love me Licia, Licia dolce Licia, and Teneramente Licia.

See also
List of Italian television series

External links
 

Italian television series
1988 Italian television series debuts
Television shows based on manga
Italia 1 original programming